Graziella Mascia (4 September 1953 – 11 March 2018) was an Italian politician.

Born in Magenta, Lombardy, she joined the Italian Communist Party in 1972 and served on its central committee from 1979 to 1983. She became of a member of the Communist Refoundation Party in 1991, and was elected to the Chamber of Deputies between 2001 and 2008. She died on 11 March 2018, aged 64, in Robecco sul Naviglio.

References

1953 births
2018 deaths
People from Magenta, Lombardy
Italian Communist Party politicians
Communist Refoundation Party politicians
Deputies of Legislature XIV of Italy
Deputies of Legislature XV of Italy
Politicians of Lombardy